Live at Tonic is a three-disc album by bassist Christian McBride, recorded at Tonic in New York on January 10–11, 2005. The album was released on May 2, 2006 by Ropeadope Records. Tonic was a music venue located at 107 Norfolk Street, New York City, which opened in the spring of 1998 and closed in April 2007.

Reception
John Fordham, writing for The Guardian commented: "McBride's roots lie in R&B, funk and Philly soul as much as bebop. This triple live album is an impressive commitment to the primacy of groove-based music, freedom, jazz and dance." Will Layman of PopMatters commented "That the Christian McBride Band is already a get-you-to-your-feet live act is without question. But are they a thoughtful jazz group that is moving the music forward? Maybe that's not what this two-night stand was about. But, after sticking with it and even enjoying it for its three-disc length, you probably have the right to expect more the next time out. We'll see." The Buffalo News review by Jeff Simon noted, "There's no use anyone pretending to weep and wail over McBride's abandonment of Charles Mingus Way for an aerie on the path begun by the late Jaco Pastorius. McBride is a large, lusty jazz spirit and definitely his own infectious kind of bandleader."

Scott Yanow of Allmusic stated: "Live at Tonic is a three-CD set that contains highlights from his opening sets during two nights at Tonic on the first disc, and his complete second sets on discs two and three. It is clear, after hearing the first couple of numbers, that McBride loves funk and stretching out. The first disc has his regular quartet with tenor-saxophonist Ron Blake, keyboardist Geoff Keezer, and drummer Terreon Gully digging into eight numbers, including Weather Report's "Boogie Woogie Waltz" and some straight-ahead jamming. The second disc has the group augmented by guest pianist Jason Moran, violinist Jenny Scheinman, and guitarist Charlie Hunter, while the third has guests on trumpet, guitar, boom box, and turntables. Unfortunately, the songs (particularly on the second and third CDs) are not of very high quality and the funk seems to go on forever, particularly on the 29-minute "See Jam, Hear Jam, Feel Jam" ... There are some good moments along the way and the musicians are great, but some editing and common sense should have gone into this production."

Track listing

Disc 1

Disc 2

Disc 3

Personnel 
Christian McBride Band
Christian McBride (acoustic and electric bass)
Geoffrey Keezer (keyboards)
Terreon Gully (drums)
Ron Blake (tenor, soprano, baritone saxophones, flute)

Additional musicians
Charlie Hunter (guitar)
Jason Moran (piano)
Jenny Scheinman (violin)
DJ Logic (turntables)
Scratch (beat box)
Eric Krasno (guitars)
Rashawn Ross (trumpets)

Chart performance

References

External links 
 Christian McBride Discography

 

2006 live albums
Christian McBride albums
Ropeadope Records live albums